Corruption of Blood may refer to:

 Corruption of Blood, a 1994 crime novel by Michael Gruber (author) / Robert K. Tanenbaum
 Attainder#Corruption of blood, a concept in English criminal law